The Go Go Posse is a compilation album released in 1988. The album consists of nine original songs recorded by prominent Washington, D.C.-based go-go bands and hip hop artists, and includes the anti-violence song "D.C. Don't Stand for Dodge City".

Track listing

Background
The "Go Go Posse" was a supergroup consisting of D.C. Scorpio, Chuck Brown & the Soul Searchers, Rare Essence, Little Benny & the Masters, and E.U. The song "D.C. Don't Stand for Dodge City" was an anti-violence song recorded and released as a single in 1988. The song was released in response to the dramatic increase in violent and drug-related murders in D.C. during the crack epidemic in the late-80s. During this time period, D.C. was labeled the "Murder Capital of the United States" and go-go and hip hop culture received much of the blame for the increasing crime rates. The "Go Go Posse" united to release this song as a response to the growing criticism of go-go music, and to encourage its patrons to stop the violence.

See also
Stop the Violence Movement
Crime in Washington, D.C.

References

External links
 The Go Go Posse at Discogs.com

1988 compilation albums
All-star recordings
Charity albums
Chuck Brown albums
Experience Unlimited albums
Rare Essence albums